Hedleya macleayi is an operculate species of  land snail in the family Pupinidae and the superfamily Cyclophoridae.

This species is endemic to Australia.

References

Gastropods of Australia
Hedleya
Vulnerable fauna of Australia
Taxonomy articles created by Polbot
Taxa named by James Charles Cox